is a Japanese football player. He plays for Saurcos Fukui.

Club statistics

References

External links

1990 births
Living people
Association football people from Hokkaido
Japanese footballers
J2 League players
Japan Football League players
Mito HollyHock players
Zweigen Kanazawa players
Vanraure Hachinohe players
Association football midfielders
Sportspeople from Sapporo